The 2015 Milton Keynes Council election took place on 7 May 2015 to elect members of Milton Keynes Council in England. This was on the same day as other local elections.

Election results

Council make up
After the 2015 local election, the political make up of the council was as follows:

Ward results

References

2015 English local elections
May 2015 events in the United Kingdom
2015
2010s in Buckinghamshire